Central Academy of Fine Arts (CAFA; Simplified Chinese: 中央美术学院; Traditional Chinese: 中央美術學院 ) is the only institution of higher education for fine arts under the administration of the  Ministry of Education of China. The Manila Bulletin calls the school "China’s most prestigious and renowned art academy". It is one of the most selective universities in the country and turns away more than 95% of applicants every year. The acceptance rate was only 1.58% in 2019. Central Academy of Fine Arts is included in the Chinese state Double First Class University Plan as a Double First Class University. Central Academy of Fine Arts was the first national school of fine arts in Chinese history, and also the beginning of Chinese modern education of fine arts. Since its establishment in 1918, it has produced many notable Artists. Central Academy of Fine Arts (CAFA) is ranked No.1 in Fine Arts by the Development Centre for Academic Degrees and Postgraduate Education, Ministry of Education, China.

Overview
The history of the National Art School in Beiping dates back to the founding of the National School of Fine Arts in Beijing in 1918, advocated by the educator Cai Yuanpei. It was the first national school of fine arts in China and also the beginning of Chinese modern education of fine arts. The academy was founded in April 1950, as a result of a merger between the National Art School in Beiping and the department of fine arts at the third campus of North China University.  The former principals of CAFA include Xu Beihong, Jiang Feng, Wu Zuoren, Gu Yuan and Jin Shangyi. The current president is the painter and historian of fine arts, Prof. Pan Gongkai. The current Vice President is the contemporary artist, Xu Bing. The current secretary of CPC's committee is Yang Li. The current director of academic commission is Jin Shangyi.

The academy comprises six specialty schools: Fine Art, Chinese Painting, Design, Architecture, Humanities and Urban Design. A post-graduate education school and high school of fine arts are also affiliated. There are 534 teachers and staff for 3,800 undergraduate and graduate students and over 100 international students. Its museum of fine arts boasts precious collections, including more than 2,000 Chinese scroll paintings from the Ming dynasty. CAFA edits, publishes and distributes two national first-class academic magazines, "Fine Arts Study" and "Fine Arts of the World".

The design programme of CAFA was renewed in 1995 in the name of the Department of Art Design after a break of some forty years and became the School of Design in October 2002. The university's goal of preparing and training the students as future professionals in design with creative thinking and practical capabilities, the School of Design offers undergraduate, graduate and Ph.D. degrees in programs ranging from visual communication design, product design, fashion design, photography, digital media to design theory and history. The School of Design plays an important role in promoting design in China and is intensively involved in design activities, most noticeable of which are its designs for the 2008 Beijing Olympics.

The new CAFA Art Museum, designed by Japanese architect Arata Isozaki, is located at the northeast corner of CAFA campus at No.8, Huajiadi Nan Street, Wangjing, with an area of 3546 m2 and a total floor area of 14,777 m2. The Museum opened in October 2008 for the University's 90th anniversary. The new six-floor museum has several notable collections, including over 2,000 historic Chinese scroll paintings from the Ming Dynasty. The museum hosts rotating exhibitions.

The school drew media attention during the Tiananmen Square protests of 1989 when the students created a large statue called the Goddess of Democracy. Each of the eight art academies signed a statement explaining the purpose of the statue.

In 2018 the asteroid 118418 Yangmei was named in honor of the academy.

In 2019 the university was ranked 27 for art and design in the QS World University Rankings.

Schools and colleges

Faculty of Art and Design
 School of Chinese Painting
 School of Fine Art
 Department of Oil Painting
 Department of Printmaking
 Department of Sculpture
 Department of Mural Painting
 School of Experimental Art
 School of Humanities
 Department of Art History and Theory
 Department of Cultural Heritage
 Non-material Cultural Heritage Research Center
 Information Center
 School of Design
 Visual Communication
 Industrial Design
 Digital Media Design
 Photography
 Fashion Design
 Jewelry Design
 School of Architecture
 Architecture
 Landscape Design
 Interior Design
 College of City Design
 Department of Information Design
 Publishing Design
 Communication Design
 Commercial Information Design
 Department of Product Design
Ceramic Design
 Artwork Design
 Interior Product Design
 Jewelry Design
 Department of Space Design
Public Art
 Exhibition Design
 Visual System Design
 Department of Video Design
Animation
 Game Design
 Experimental Movie
 School of Arts Administration and Education

Graduate school
 Master's Degree Course
 Doctoral Degree Course

Museum of CAFA
Set up in the early 1960s, the Museum of Central Academy of Fine Arts (formerly CAFA Gallery), has a collection of 13,000 works which cover a wide variety of genres and styles, including representative works by ancient and modern Chinese masters as well as fine student works. Since the incorporation of the foundation of the Academy in 1950 it has contained Chinese painting, oil painting, print, sculpture and folk art such as New Year picture, embroidery and minority ethnic costume and objects, along with Chinese relics of bronze, pottery, engravings and rubbings.

Designed by Arata Isozaki, a renowned Japanese architect, the new museum of CAFA is a building of 14,777 square meters on a land of 3,546 square meters, with four floors above ground and two floors underground. The museum opened in September 2008, together with the collection warehouse, permanent and temporary exhibition halls, as well as supporting facilities including artist studios, lecture and conference rooms and cafeteria and bookstore.

Library
CAFA‘s Library has a long history. As one of the largest professional libraries in China it has 360,000 books and paintings of various kinds, whose special collection includes woodblock New Year pictures, string-bound ancient books with illustrations, rubbings from stone-engraved portraits of Han Dynasty, tablets of various dynasties and the first-hand copies from engraved seals, etc.  The library has reading rooms for art books, social science books and magazines and multi-media reading.  The library provides CJFD and CDMD of CNKI e-books on the Shushing website, National Palace Museum-Online and Taiwan Doctor/Master Dissertations Database and its own fine arts reference full-text database and dissertation names in core journals collected by CAFA, etc.

Notable alumni
Beohar Rammanohar Sinha
Chen Man
Fang Lijun
He Chengyao
Hung Liu
Jiang Shuo
Jin Shangyi
Old Xian
Sui Jianguo
Wang Chunchen
Wu Guanzhong
Wu Shaoxiang
Wu Zuoren
Xu Bing
Yan Cong
Yu Xingze
Zhang Huan

See also
 Chinese fine art

References

External links

 Official website of CAFA
 CAFA Museum website

 
Educational institutions established in 1918
1918 establishments in China
Educational institutions established in 1950
1950 establishments in China